Marya Delver (born August 9, 1974, in Melfort, Saskatchewan) is a Canadian actress. She is most noted for her role as Laurel in the 2001 film Last Wedding, for which she was a Genie Award nominee for Best Supporting Actress at the 22nd Genie Awards, and her recurring role as Officer Eglee in Sons of Anarchy.

Her other roles have included the films Better Than Chocolate, Here's to Life! and Waydowntown, as well as a recurring role in Leap Years. In 2003, she starred alongside Fabrizio Filippo and Marcello Cabezas in a production of Kenneth Lonergan's This Is Our Youth, which was directed by Woody Harrelson.

Filmography

Film

Television

References

External links

1974 births
Canadian film actresses
Canadian stage actresses
Canadian television actresses
Actresses from Saskatchewan
Living people
People from Melfort, Saskatchewan
20th-century Canadian actresses
21st-century Canadian actresses